Karl Diedrich Bader (born December 24, 1966) is an American actor. He is best known for his comedy-centered and voice acting-related roles. He has appeared as a series regular in television sitcoms The Drew Carey Show, American Housewife, and Outsourced, along with notable recurring roles in Better Things and Veep. His film credits include The Beverly Hillbillies, Office Space, EuroTrip, and Napoleon Dynamite. He has also had a prolific voiceover career, playing characters such as Hoss Delgado in The Grim Adventures of Billy and Mandy, Zeta in The Zeta Project, Tank in the film Surf's Up, and provided the voice of Bruce Wayne / Batman in multiple animated films and television series, beginning in 2008 with Batman: The Brave and the Bold.

Early life
Karl Diedrich Bader was born in Alexandria, Virginia, on Christmas Eve, 1966, the son of Gretta Bader (née Margaret Marie Lange; 1931–2014), a sculptor, and William B. Bader (1931–2016), a foundation executive and political activist. His patrilineal great-grandfather was Edward L. Bader, who served as the mayor of Atlantic City, New Jersey and is of German and Scottish heritage.

When Bader was two years old, his family moved to Paris, but he returned to the U.S. to attend Groveton High School. He graduated from T.C. Williams High School in Alexandria, Virginia, and attended college at the University of North Carolina School of the Arts.

Career 

After a few guest roles on popular television series such as The Fresh Prince of Bel-Air, Star Trek: The Next Generation, Quantum Leap, Diagnosis: Murder and Cheers, Bader's first major role was in the 1993 series Danger Theatre, playing The Searcher. He moved into cinema acting for the 1993 film version of The Beverly Hillbillies, but returned to television, playing Oswald on The Drew Carey Show starting in 1995. He appeared in the 1999 film Office Space as Peter's neighbor Lawrence, and in the 2004 film Napoleon Dynamite as Rex, the owner of a Taekwondo dojang. He performs in the 2004 film Eurotrip as a thief. In 2010, Bader took the role of Charlie on the television series Outsourced.

As a voice actor, he has voiced various characters in animated features, television series and video games, such as Ice Age, The Simpsons, Buzz Lightyear of Star Command, The Grim Adventures of Billy and Mandy, South Park and The Penguins of Madagascar. In 2012, he reprised his role as Rex in the animated TV series Napoleon Dynamite. He played the Russian Cosmonaut Yuri in Disney's Space Buddies. Bader has lent his voice to several different Batman cartoons, portraying both heroes and villains: Batman Beyond, The Zeta Project, The Batman, and starring as the title character Bruce Wayne / Batman in Batman: The Brave and the Bold and Harley Quinn. Bader also voices Guy Gardner in Green Lantern: The Animated Series.

His other voice credits include JLA Adventures: Trapped in Time, Judah Mannowdog in Bojack Horseman, the android Zeta in The Zeta Project, and the Fiskerton Phantom in The Secret Saturdays.

In 2016, Bader starred in the "It's the Obvious Choice" series of Time Warner Cable television commercials and starred as Greg Otto in ABC sitcom American Housewife from 2016 to 2021. From 2014 to 2019, Bader had a recurring role on HBO sitcom Veep. Since 2016, Bader has had a recurring role as best friend, Rich, on Better Things.

Personal life
Bader has been married to actress Dulcy Rogers since May 1997. Together they have two children, Ondine and Sebastian.

Bader supported Libertarian candidate Gary Johnson during the 2016 United States presidential election. In 2020, he later endorsed for Joe Biden in the 2020 United States Presidential election after Elizabeth Warren dropped out of the race.

Filmography

Live-action

Film

Television

Web

Voice roles

Film

Television

Video games

References

External links

 
 
 

1966 births
Living people
American expatriates in France
American male comedians
American male film actors
American male television actors
American male video game actors
American male voice actors
American people of German descent
American people of Scottish descent
Audiobook narrators
Male actors from Alexandria, Virginia
T. C. Williams High School alumni
University of North Carolina School of the Arts alumni
20th-century American male actors
21st-century American male actors
Virginia Democrats